Leonard Hewitt (20 March 1920 – 24 May 1979) was a Welsh professional footballer, who played as a forward. He made appearances in the English Football League with Wrexham. He also played non-league football for Altrincham.

References

1920 births
1979 deaths
Welsh footballers
Association football forwards
Wrexham A.F.C. players
Altrincham F.C. players
English Football League players
Footballers from Wrexham